Acacia demissa is a species of Acacia native to an area of Western Australia inland of Shark Bay. It is closely related to A. quadrimarginea, with which it may hybridise.

References

demissa
Acacias of Western Australia
Endemic flora of Western Australia
Plants described in 1995
Taxa named by Bruce Maslin
Taxa named by Richard Sumner Cowan